Beau-James Wells (born 17 November 1995) is a New Zealand freestyle skier. He represented his country at the 2014 Winter Olympics in Sochi, finishing in 21st place in the qualifying round of the Men's Slopestyle and did not advance to the final. He was the flag bearer in the opening ceremony of 2018 Winter Olympics in Pyongchang. His brothers Byron, Jossi, and Jackson are all also freestyle skiers.

References

External links
 
 
 

1995 births
Freestyle skiers at the 2014 Winter Olympics
Living people
Olympic freestyle skiers of New Zealand
New Zealand male freestyle skiers
Freestyle skiers at the 2012 Winter Youth Olympics
People from Wānaka
Freestyle skiers at the 2018 Winter Olympics